The Nembe Kingdom is a traditional state in Niger Delta. It includes the Nembe and Brass Local Government Areas of Bayelsa State, Nigeria. The traditional rulers take the title "Amanyanabo". Today, leadership is split between the Amanyanabos of Ogbolomabiri, Bassambiri, Okpoama, Odioama and Twon Brass.

History

The Nembes are an Izon people of the Niger Delta region, settled in the region that now includes the Edumanom Forest Reserve.
The date of foundation of the old Nembe kingdom is unknown.
Tradition says that the tenth king was called Ogio, ruling around 1639, the ancestor of all subsequent kings.
A civil war later split the city into two factions. At the start of the 19th century, king Ogbodo and his followers moved to a new settlement at Bassimibiri, while king Mingi remained at Nembe city.

With the arrival of Europeans on the coast, the Nembe kingdom became a trading state, but was relatively poor compared to Bonny and Calabar.

The Nembe slave trade picked up in the second quarter of the 19th century when the British attempted to suppress slave-trading in Africa by blockading the ports of Bonny and Calabar. The position of Nembe town 30 miles up the Brass River became an advantage in these circumstances. However, with dwindling demand for slaves, by 1856 the palm-oil trade had become more important and trade had moved to the town of Twon-Brass on the coast. In the later 19th century, Christian missionaries contributed to the existing factional tensions among the Nembe. Ogbolomabiri acquired a Christian mission in 1867, while Bassambiri remained "heathen".

After 1884, the Nembe kingdom was included in the area over which the British claimed sovereignty as part of the Oil Rivers Protectorate. The Nembe, who by now controlled the palm oil trade, at first refused to sign a treaty, and sought to prevent the Royal Niger Company obtaining a trade monopoly.  In January 1895 the Nembe King William Koko led a dawn attack of more than a thousand warriors on the company's headquarters at Akassa. This triggered a retaliatory raid in which an expeditionary force led by Sir Frederick Bedford captured and sacked Nembe, occurring concurrently with a devastating outbreak of smallpox in the Kingdom.  The British later established a consulate in Twon-Brass, from where they administered the area.
Traditional rulers were reinstalled in the 1920s, but with an essentially symbolic role which they retain today.

Rulers

Ogbolomabiri
Rulers of Ogbolomabiri:

Bassambiri

Later rulers of Bassambiri:

Twon/Brass

References

History of Nigeria
Nigerian traditional states
Ijaw states